Eesti tippmodell, season 4 was the fourth installment of the Estonian adaptation of America's Next Top Model founded by Tyra Banks. The judges for this season were Mari-Liis Helvik, Toomas Volkmann, and Liisi Eesmaa, who also served as the show's host. As in the previous season, males were featured in the cast. The season aired from December 2015 to February 2016.
The restrictions in height and measurement were less strict as in previous cycles.

The winner of the competition was 22-year-old Kätlin Hallik from Tallinn. As her prizes, she received a brand new Toyota Avensis, a supply of Kallos cosmetics, a position as the face of Dormeo.

Episode summaries

Episode 1 
Original Airdate: 

Immune from elimination: Maria Bountiy 
Bottom two: Alice Filips & Taavet Suurmõts
Eliminated: None
Featured photographer: Kirill Gvozdev
Special guest: Stefani Kask

Episode 2 
Original Airdate: 
 
Challenge winner: Evelina Säkk 
Eliminated: Maria Bountiy
Entered: Antonio Kass
Featured photographer: Viktor Koshkin
Special guest: Gerili Narusing

Episode 3 Original Airdate: 
 
Challenge winners: Kätlin Hallik & Evelina Säkk 
Immune from elimination: Kristjan Sõrg 
Disqualified: Diana Haprova
Featured photographer: Oliver Moosus

Episode 4 Original Airdate:  
 
Challenge winner: Helena Pertens
Immune from elimination: Helena Pertens 
Bottom two: Liina Ilves & Taavet Suurmõts
Eliminated: Liina Ilves & Taavet Suurmõts
Featured photographer: Toomas Volkmann

Episode 5 Original Airdate: 
 
Challenge winner: None
Immune from elimination: Kätlin Hallik
Bottom three: Evelina Säkk, Rait Nöör & Joosep Padu
Eliminated: Joosep Padu
Featured photographer: Sandra Palm

Episode 6 Original Airdate: 
 
Challenge winner: Anastassia Bubnilkina
Immune from elimination: Alice Philips
Originally eliminated:  Rait Nöör

Episode 7 Original Airdate: 

Immune from elimination: Antonio Kass
Bottom two: Alice Philips & Anastassia Bubnilkina
Eliminated: None
Immune from elimination: Kätlin Hallik
Bottom two: Helena Pertens & Kristjan Sõrg 
Eliminated: Kristjan Sõrg

Episode 8Original Airdate: 

Immune from elimination: Anastassia Bubnilkina & German Pinelis
Eliminated outside of judging panel: Alice Philips & Rait Nöör
Featured photographer: Erlend Štaub

Episode 9Original Airdate: 

Challenge winners: Antonio Kass & German Pinelis
Immune from elimination: Kätlin Hallik
Eliminated: Helena Pertens

Episode 10Original Airdate: 

Bottom three: Anastassia Bubnilkina, Evelina Säkk & German Pinelis
Eliminated: Anastassia Bubnilkina

Episode 11Original Airdate: 

Eliminated: None

Episode 12Original Airdate: 

Final four: Antonio Kass, Evelina Säkk, German Pinelis & Kätlin Hallik
Third runner-up: Antonio Kass
Second runner-up: Evelina Säkk
Runner-up: German Pinelis
Estonia's Next Top Model: Kätlin Hallik

Contestants(ages are stated at start of contest)Summaries

Elimination table

 The contestant was part of a collective call out with another contestant
 The contestant was immune from elimination
 The contestant was at risk of elimination
 The contestant was eliminated
 The contestant was disqualified from the competition
 The contestant was originally eliminated from the competition but was saved
 The contestant was eliminated outside of judging panel
 The contestant won the competition

 With the exception of casting in episode 1, no call-out was held during eliminations. 
 In episode 1, Maria was immune from elimination for having performed the best on set. During elimination, Alice and Taveet were singled out as the bottom two for having performed the worst during the runway challenge, but neither of them were eliminated.
 In episode 2, Evelina was immune from elimination for winning the video challenge. Antonio entered the competition as a wildcard contestant the following episode.
In episode 3, Kristjan was immune from elimination for having the best overall performance, while Diana was disqualified from the competition for communicating with her family and disclosing the location of the photo shoots during filming.
 In episode 4, Helena was immune from elimination for winning the challenge. Liina and Taavet were singled out as the bottom two, and both were eliminated from the competition.
 In episode 5, Kätlin was immune from elimination for her overall best performance. Evelina, Joosep and Rait were singled out as the bottom three, and Joosep was eliminated from the competition.
 In episode 6, Alice and Anastassia were immune from elimination for her overall best performance. Rait was originally eliminated, but was saved because it was his birthday.
 In episode 7, There were two separate immunities and bottom twos. Kätlin and Antonio were immune from both of them.
In the first elimination, Anastassia and Alice were chosen as the bottom two, but neither of them was eliminated. 
In the second elimination, Helena and Kristjan were chosen as the bottom two, and Kristjan was eliminated.
 In episode 8, Anastassia and German were immune from elimination for their overall best performance. Alice and Rait were both eliminated outside the judging panel. No one else was eliminated that week.

Photo shoot guide
Episode 1 photo shoot: Campaign for sunglasses in pairs
Episode 2 photo shoot: Condom campaign in pairs
Episode 3 photo shoot: Living sculptures in a sauna
Episode 4 photo shoot: Goldtime Jewelry in pairs
Episode 5 photo shoot: Posing with farm animals
Episode 6 photo shoot: Posing with a car
Episode 7 photo shoot: 20's glamour for Expressions''
Episode 8 photo shoot: Wedding couples
Episode 9 photo shoot: B&W beauty shots
Episode 10 photo shoots: Japanese manga in Liisi Eesmaa designs; Fazer Tutti Frutti with parrots
Episode 11 photo shoots: Selling various products; Magnum ice cream campaign

References

External links
 Official Show Website

Eesti tippmodell
2015 Estonian television seasons
2016 Estonian television seasons